Generator Hostels is a chain of hostels headquartered in London, United Kingdom. As of 2020 the company operates 16 hostels in Europe and the United States, including properties in Dublin, London, Copenhagen, Hamburg, Berlin (three hostels), Venice, Barcelona, Paris, Madrid, Stockholm, Rome, Amsterdam, Miami and Washington.

History 

Generator hostels was established in 1995 as a single property in London by siblings, Louise and Kingsley Duffy.

In 2002, the company expanded for the first time, opening a location in Berlin. In 2007, the two properties were acquired by Patron Capital, beginning a new chapter for the company. International travel expert Fredrik Korallus was hired as CEO  alongside Anwar Mekhayech, the creative director.
 
In 2011, Generator begin what would be the expansion of multiple locations over the next few years, opening locations in Copenhagen and Dublin. A year later, a second location in Berlin opened, along with locations in Venice, Barcelona, and Hamburg.

Generator Paris opened in February 2015, followed by Generator Amsterdam in March 2016 and Stockholm in June of the same year.  At that time, Patron continued to own a majority stake in the company. In September, Generator acquired most of the units in the Atlantic Princess Condominium in Miami Beach; in preparation for the planned opening of a hostel there in 2017.

Locations

List of Generator Hostels as of March 2023.

References

External links
Generator hostels website

Hostels
Hotel and leisure companies based in London